Herzl Rosenblum (also known as Herzl Vardi, 14 August 1903 – 1 February 1991) was an Israeli journalist and politician. A signatory of the Israeli declaration of independence, he worked as editor of Yedioth Ahronoth for more than 35 years.

Biography
Born in Kaunas in the Russian Empire (today in Lithuania), Rosenblum moved to Vienna after experiencing anti-semitism and being prevented from studying law. In Vienna, he studied law and economics, gaining a PhD.

He then moved to London, where he worked as an aide to Ze'ev Jabotinsky, a leader of the Revisionist Zionism movement. In 1935 he immigrated to Mandate Palestine and started working for the HaBoker newspaper, where he wrote under the pseudonym Herzl Vardi.

In 1948 Rosenblum signed Israel's declaration of independence as a representative of the Revisionist movement. When he stepped up to sign, Yishuv leader David Ben-Gurion told him "Sign Vardi, not Rosenblum", as he wanted more Hebrew names on the document. Although Rosenblum later legally changed his name to Vardi (hence his son being named Moshe Vardi), he never used it, and later admitted that he wished he had 
signed as Rosenblum.

The following year, Rosenblum became editor of Yedioth Ahronoth following the departure of Ezriel Carlebach and several other staff members to found Yedioth Maariv. He remained as editor until 1986, during which time the paper became the largest selling in the country. His son, Moshe, was later employed as editor. After his retirement he published his memoirs, Drops from the Sea (Tipot min HaYam).

References

1903 births
1991 deaths
University of Vienna alumni
Signatories of the Israeli Declaration of Independence
Lithuanian Jews
Lithuanian emigrants to Mandatory Palestine
Israeli journalists
Israeli opinion journalists
Yedioth Ahronoth people
Burials at Trumpeldor Cemetery
20th-century journalists
Israeli newspaper editors
Lithuanian expatriates in Austria
Lithuanian expatriates in the United Kingdom